The Kim reformer is a type of syngas plant invented by Hyun Yong Kim. It is a high temperature furnace (as shown in figure 1), filled with steam and/or carbon dioxide gas and maintaining a thermal equilibrium at a temperature just above 1200 °C, in which the reforming reaction is at its thermodynamic equilibrium and carbonaceous substance is reformed with the highest efficiency.

In December 2000, Kim discovered that the reforming reaction (C + H2O ↔ CO + H2) proceeds at a temperature just above 1200 °C, but not below it. This work was published in International Journal[1] and registered in KR patent, US patent, CN patent, and JP patent.

Overview
The reformer reforms all carbon atoms of carbonaceous feedstock to produce just syngas, no other hydrocarbons. The high temperature furnace is packed with castables to minimize heat loss in such a way as to maintain the inner temperature of a reduction reactor filled with steam and carbon dioxide (CO2) gas at a temperature just above 1200 °C (aka Kim temperature, see figure 2), and it reforms all carbonaceous substances most efficiently to produce syngas. The produced syngas exits from the reduction reactor at a temperature of 1200 °C. The reduction chamber is heated by super-hot gases (steam and CO2) generated in the syngas burner with oxygen gas. The reduction chamber must be constructed to withstand, physically and chemically, the reforming reaction at 1200 °C.

Advantages
Both steam reforming and dry reforming are carried out in this reformer; therefore, it is possible to configure the H2/CO ratio by adjusting the H2O/CO2 ratio in the reduction chamber. The reforming reaction is a very specific elementary reaction; all carbon atoms on the left are reformed into carbon monoxide and all hydrogen atoms are reduced to hydrogen gas. The mixture of two product gases is called syngas. These reforming reactions are an endothermic reduction reaction. In contrast, the conventional gasification reaction is a combination of several reactions operating below 1200 °C and the product is a mixture of many gases.

History of reforming reactions
The process for producing water gas (C + H2O → CO + H2) has been known since the 19th century and it was later found that it is applicable to all carbonaceous substances. Reactions C + H2O ↔ CO + H2 and (-CH2) + H2O → CO + 2H2 are called steam reforming and reactions C + CO2 → 2CO and (-CH2) + CO2 → 2CO + H2, carbon dioxide or dry reforming. The oil industry has used the reforming reactions extensively for the cracking process and to generate hydrogen gas.

References

Chemical equipment
Fuel gas
Synthetic fuels